Tianjin Binhai New Area Library, nicknamed The Eye, is a library in Tianjin, China. It is part of the Binhai Cultural Center, being one of its five central attractions.

Architecture and description 

It features floor-to-ceiling, terraced bookshelves able to hold 1.2 million books, and a large, luminous sphere in the center that serves as an auditorium with a capacity of 110 people. The library is nicknamed 'The Evil Eye' because the sphere, which appears like an iris, can be seen from the park outside through an eye-shaped opening.

In the first week after opening day, approximately 10,000 people a day came, causing queues outside.

The first and second floors contain mainly lounge areas and reading rooms. The floors above have computer rooms, meeting rooms, and offices. There are also two rooftop patios. Because of a decision to complete the library quickly and a conflict with what was officially approved, the main atrium cannot be used for book storage; the rooms providing access to the upper tiers of shelving were not built and book spines were printed onto the backs of the shelf space for the opening-day photographs.

Construction 
The library was designed by the Rotterdam-based architectural firm MVRDV along with the Tianjin Urban Planning and Design Institute (TUPDI), a group of local architects. Because of a tight construction schedule by the local government, the project went from preliminary drawings to its doors opening within three years. It opened in October 2017.

Notes and references

External links

Official page of the library at Binhai Cultural Center  
Image gallery at CNN

Libraries in Tianjin
2017 establishments in China
Libraries established in 2017